Fort William Point is the conspicuous flat-topped rocky headland forming the northwest extremity of Coppermine Peninsula and Robert Island in the South Shetland Islands, Antarctica.  The point is a northwest entrance point of English Strait and forms the west side of the entrance to Carlota Cove.

The feature was named by the early 19th century sealers who used it as a landmark for entering English Strait from the north.

Location

See also

 List of lighthouses in Antarctica
 Composite Antarctic Gazetteer
 Robert Island
 SCAR
 South Shetland Islands
 Territorial claims in Antarctica

Maps
 L.L. Ivanov. Antarctica: Livingston Island and Greenwich, Robert, Snow and Smith Islands. Scale 1:120000 topographic map.  Troyan: Manfred Wörner Foundation, 2009.

References

External links 
		
 SCAR Composite Antarctic Gazetteer

Headlands of Robert Island